, known as Yoshiki, is a Japanese musician, songwriter, composer and record producer. He is best known as the leader and a co-founder of the visual kei rock bands X Japan and The Last Rockstars, for which he is the drummer, pianist, and main songwriter. He has been described by Billboard as a "musical innovator" and named "one of the most influential composers in Japanese history" by Consequence of Sound. Yoshiki's solo career includes several classical studio albums and collaborations with artists such as George Martin, Bono, will.i.am, Jennifer Hudson, St. Vincent, Stan Lee, Roger Taylor and Brian May of Queen, Gene Simmons and KISS, Nicole Scherzinger, and Sarah Brightman.

In 1999, at the request of the Japanese government, he composed and performed a classical song at a celebration in honor of the tenth anniversary of Emperor Akihito's enthronement. Yoshiki also composed the theme for the  69th Golden Globe Awards as well as for several anime and film soundtracks including Attack on Titan and Saw IV.

Life and career

1965–1982: Early years and Dynamite/Noise 
Yoshiki was born on November 20, 1965 in Tateyama, Chiba Prefecture, as the elder of two brothers in a musically oriented family. His father was a tap dancer and jazz pianist, his mother played the shamisen, while his aunt played the koto. He began taking piano lessons and music theory at age four. He then became interested in classical works by Ludwig van Beethoven and Franz Schubert. In elementary school, he played the trumpet in the brass band, and around age ten started composing songs for piano. This period was a decisive point in his life. He was 10 years old when his father committed suicide; he found relief in rock music. After discovering the music of American hard rock band Kiss, he started learning to play drums and guitar. Yoshiki was also influenced by works from Led Zeppelin, Iron Maiden, Sex Pistols, David Bowie, Queen, The Beatles, Charged GBH and Pyotr Ilyich Tchaikovsky. Soon with his childhood friend Toshi formed a band called Dynamite in 1977. Dynamite changed its name to Noise a year later.

1982–1997: X Japan 

When Noise disbanded in 1982, Yoshiki and Toshi formed a new band, which they named X while they tried to think of another name, but the name stuck. In 1986, Yoshiki founded his own independent record label, Extasy Records, in order to distribute the band's music. On December 26, 1987, the band participated in an audition held by CBS/Sony which led to a recording contract in August of the following year. The band's breakthrough came in 1989 with the release of their second, and major debut, album Blue Blood, which reached number six on the Oricon chart and charted for more than 100 weeks.  In 1990, the band received the "Grand Prix New Artist of the Year" award at the 4th Japan Gold Disc Awards. In 1991 they released their hit million-selling album Jealousy, and were the first Japanese metal band to perform in Japan's largest indoor concert venue, the Tokyo Dome. The following year they announced the renaming of the band to X Japan in order to launch an international career with an American album release, however, this ultimately did not happen.

1991–1999: Solo work and Eternal Melody 
That same year he began his first solo activities outside X. Collaborating with Tetsuya Komuro for the rock unit V2, with a concert on December 5 at the Tokyo Bay NK Hall and the single "Haitoku no Hitomi ~Eyes of Venus~/Virginity" (背徳の瞳〜Eyes of Venus〜) in January 1992, which reached number two on the chart. On December 12, Yoshiki released his first album, the classical compilation Yoshiki Selection, which includes classical works, and its sequel followed six years later.

In 1992, he bought a recording studio complex in North Hollywood, California, US. Extasy Recording Studios would become where recordings for nearly all his projects take place, until he sold it in the 2010s. In the early 1990s through his record label would debut million-selling bands Glay and Luna Sea. He began learning about jazz improvisation and orchestration.

On April 21, 1993 he released his first original solo album, the classical studio album Eternal Melody, which was performed by the London Philharmonic Orchestra and produced by the Beatles producer George Martin. Besides including orchestral arrangements of X Japan songs, it contained two new songs as well. The album reached number 6 on the charts. On November 3, the singles "Amethyst" and "Ima wo Dakishimete" (今を抱きしめて) were released and reached number five and three respectively on the charts. The later single was a karaoke adaptation of the second orchestral song from the first single, but name credit went to TBS as it was the theme song to one of their dramas, recorded by the lead actors under the group name NOA. In 1994, it was the 35th annual best-selling single and won the "Excellence award" at the 36th Japan Record Awards.

In 1994, Yoshiki worked with Queen drummer Roger Taylor on a song he composed, "Foreign Sand", for which Roger wrote the lyrics. They performed the song at The Great Music Experience event in May, partly backed by Unesco, which featured many other Japanese and Western musicians. The single was released in June, and reached the top fifteen in Japan, and 26th in the UK. That same month, the Kiss tribute album Kiss My Ass was released, for which Yoshiki contributed an orchestral arrangement of "Black Diamond" played by the American Symphony Orchestra.

With X Japan's popularity increasing, Yoshiki and the band collaborated with Mugen Motorsports and sponsored racer Katsumi Yamamoto, who drove for team "X Japan Racing" in the 1995 season of Formula Nippon. In the 1996 season, they sponsored Ralf Schumacher with both him and the team winning the championship. In 1997, Toshi decided to leave the band, claiming the success-oriented life of a rock star failed to satisfy him emotionally. The band's dissolution was officially announced in September 1997. X Japan performed their farewell show at the Tokyo Dome on December 31, 1997, making it the last of five consecutive New Year's Eve shows in that stadium. Soon afterwards, in May 1998, the band's lead guitarist Hide died, and Yoshiki withdrew from the public scene, as he was battling suicidal thoughts and eventually sought the help of a psychiatrist.

Yoshiki remained active as a producer for bands such as Dir En Grey, and contributed a cover song for the 1999 Hide tribute album, Tribute Spirits. On November 12, at the Tokyo Imperial Palace a celebration in honor of the tenth anniversary of Emperors Akihito enthronement was held and at the request of the Japanese government, Yoshiki composed and performed the song "Anniversary".

 2000–2009: Eternal Melody II, Violet UK and S.K.I.N. 
In the beginning of the 21st century, he expanded his record label with sub-divisions, Extasy Japan and Extasy International in collaboration with Warner Music, and produced several artists. In 2000, he collaborated with 7-Eleven on a series of TV commercials, for which he provided the songs "Blind Dance" and "The Other Side" by his solo musical project Violet UK. Two years prior, he contributed the song "Sane" for the 1998 film In God's Hands. The project idea was born in 1991, when Yoshiki was recording in his studio, initially doing sessions with Mick Karn and Jane Child, but it was postponed. The music involves a fusion of trip rock, breakbeat, and classical piano strings.

In September 2002, he joined the dance-oriented pop group led by Tetsuya Komuro, Globe. Though his only contribution was the single "Seize the Light" and, after recording an album, they went on hiatus with Yoshiki not rejoining them afterwards. On December 3 and 4, he held symphonic concerts with the Tokyo Philharmonic Orchestra, at Tokyo International Forum. Featuring female singers Daughter and Nicole Scherzinger, they performed older orchestral arrangements and songs created for Violet UK, such as "Unnamed Song", which was composed to mourn the victims of the September 11 attacks, and "I'll Be Your Love", which was released the following year as the debut single for American-Japanese singer Dahlia and later used as the official theme song of the world's fair, Expo 2005.

In 2003 and 2004, he provided the theme songs "Kimi Dake Dakara" and "Sekai no Owari no Yoru ni" for NHK's 50th anniversary commemorative broadcast and the 90th anniversary of Takarazuka Revue. In 2004, he helped produce the South Korean rock band The TRAX, and his composition "Tears" was used as the theme song for the film Windstruck, becoming the first Japanese song to be featured in a Korean film after World War II.  In 2005, a second classical solo album titled Eternal Melody II was released on March 23. The next day, Yoshiki conducted the Super World Orchestra in the opening ceremony of the World's Fair in the performance of a classical version of "I'll Be Your Love." At the end of the same month, a DVD recording of his previous symphonic concert was released. In December, the Violet UK song "Sex and Religion" was released via the iTunes Store, and soon afterwards "Mary Mona Lisa" unofficially via Myspace.

In 2006, Yoshiki appeared at the Otakon convention on August 6, where it was publicly announced that he would be forming a band named S.K.I.N. with rock singer Gackt, soon afterwards they were joined by Sugizo. At the JRock Revolution Festival on May 25, 2007, which was organized by Yoshiki, it was announced that Miyavi was joining. There were high expectations for the band, like to be the first Asian band to conquer the world charts, beginning with America, and to lead a rock revolution and starting a new era of rock and roll, by opening the market for Japanese in the Western music industry. But after their debut performance on June 29, 2007, at the Anime Expo in Long Beach, all activities were stopped.

That same year he co-produced the soundtrack for the 2007 film Catacombs, which included the Violet UK song "Blue Butterfly" and was released by his Extasy Records International. On October 22, 2007, X Japan's living members reunited and appeared together for the first time in over 10 years at a public filming of the promotion video for their new single "I.V.", which was created for the American horror movie Saw IV and played during the end credits but was not included on the soundtrack album. On September 20, 2007, at a Catacombs preview in Japan, it was announced that Yoshiki would be producing the 2008 rock musical Repo! The Genetic Opera and its soundtrack, along with composing one extra track for it. In 2009, he contributed the theme song "Blue Sky Heaven" for the 30th anniversary of a Nippon Television program, and for the Japanese historical fantasy film Goemon he wrote the Violet UK song "Rosa", which was released on April 29 via iTunes. That year he again collaborated with Mugen Motorsports and racing car constructor Dome for the Super GT series championship. In July 2009, he had to undergo surgery for a slipped disc in his neck, and was told by doctors to refrain from heavy drumming. His neck is so severely damaged that Yoshiki's management has said that it, "would force a professional rugby player to retire."

 2010–2017: Solo career and Yoshiki Classical 

In 2010, Yoshiki with Toshi appeared and performed at Japan Expo in Paris on July 4. In October, he fainted in his hotel room on X Japan's tour, and was subsequently diagnosed with hyperthyroidism. He teamed up with Toshi again on January 24–25, 2011, at the first expensive high-end dinner show for their project ToshI feat Yoshiki, where an orchestra was utilized and later a live album released of the show. On March 6, Yoshiki co-organized with fashion producer Jay FR (from the fashion festival "Tokyo Girls Collection") a fashion and music event "Asia Girls Explosion" at Yoyogi National Stadium. At the event many special guest models walked the runway, Yoshiki's own kimono line that he designed, and both X Japan and Violet UK performed. On May 27, "Yoshiki Radio" was launched on Sirius XM's Boneyard station. The hour-long program hosted by Yoshiki, aired the first Sunday of every month at 9 p.m. ET. On July 21, at San Diego Comic-Con International, Yoshiki unveiled the comic book series Blood Red Dragon, which was created in collaboration with American comic book legends Stan Lee and Todd McFarlane and stars a superhero version of himself.

In 2012, Yoshiki composed the theme song for the 69th Golden Globe Awards, and on January 15, 2013, the theme was officially released through iTunes in 111 countries, with all proceeds being donated to charities chosen by the Hollywood Foreign Press Association. A wax figure of Yoshiki was unveiled at Madame Tussauds Hong Kong wax museum in May 2012. In 2013, Yoshiki's figure was moved to the Tokyo location. On August 27, 2013, the third classical studio album Yoshiki Classical was released. It debuted as the #1 overall classical seller in Japan, and the #2 in the United States iTunes Store chart. In celebration of its release, a special live performance was held at the Grammy Museum.

On March 14, 2014, at the South by Southwest festival in Austin, Texas, Yoshiki performed a duet piano piece during his concert at the Qui Restaurant; one part played by him, and the other played by a hologram of himself. On April 25, Yoshiki started his first classical world tour in Costa Mesa, California, and continued throughout the world, visiting San Francisco, Mexico City, Moscow, Berlin, Paris, London, Shanghai, Beijing, Bangkok, Taipei, Tokyo and Osaka. The tour setup featured Yoshiki on piano, several strings as cellos and viola, and vocalist Katie Fitzgerald from Violet UK. Performances included classical versions of songs he composed, as well depending on the venue, some famous composers like Tchaikovsky. For an upcoming Japanese 3D CG animated film Saint Seiya: Legend of Sanctuary, Yoshiki contributed theme song "Hero" and it was unveiled on the tour. In October 2014, Yoshiki performed a concert at Madison Square Garden with X Japan. It was the group's largest U.S. headlining performance. In November 2014, Yoshiki debuted the official Hello Kitty theme song, "Hello Hello", at the first Hello Kitty Con. He was the guest of honor at Stan Lee's Comikaze Expo.

In April 2015, Yoshiki was a guest speaker and performer at the New Economy Summit (NES). In July, he performed at the Hyper Japan Festival in London, together with Toshi. Yoshiki performed with a string quartet at the 2016 Sundance Film Festival. The We Are X film, a documentary on X Japan and Yoshiki, premiered at Sundance and was selected for the World Cinema Documentary Competition. In November 2016, he won the Asian Icon Award at the Classic Rock Roll of Honour Awards in Tokyo. In 2016, he embarked on another classical world tour, with performances in Tokyo and Osaka, and a Hong Kong show that had to be cancelled due to the promoter's mistake and rescheduled as a free concert on December 30.

Yoshiki's second solo classical tour commenced in Osaka Castle Hall on December 5, 2016, with three days at the Tokyo International Forum on December 6, 7 and 8, a performance at Hong Kong's AsiaWorld-Expo scheduled for December 29 and Carnegie Hall, New York on Jan 12 and 13. The Carnegie Hall performances included the Tokyo Philharmonic Orchestra. The Tokyo concerts in December were an acclaimed success but the Hong Kong Concert on December 29 had to be canceled two hours before the show. The cancellation was due to an oversight by the promoter in applying for the entertainment license necessary to perform the show. However the date was fulfilled on the following day, December 30, by Yoshiki performing for free with ticket holders being refunded, the first time for a major music artist to do such a thing in Hong Kong. The concerts in Carnegie Hall on January 12 and 13 were successful sellout shows. Yoshiki also included in the show a surprise performance of "The Star-Spangled Banner" after a heartfelt speech about his personal pursuit of the American Dream.

 2017–present: "Red Swan", "Miracle", and The Last Rockstars 
In January 2017, Yoshiki performed two sold-out concerts at Carnegie Hall in New York. In March 2017, Yoshiki performed with a 4-piece string quartet at Hong Kong's Asia Film Awards. In April 2017, Yoshiki debuted a special collaboration T-shirt with rock group KISS titled "YOSHIKISS". During these performances, he lost sensation in his left hand and was rediagnosed with cervical foraminal stenosis. In May 2017, it was announced that Yoshiki would undergo emergency cervical artificial disc replacement surgery in Los Angeles on May 16, resulting in the cancelling of his schedule for May, and future events being possibly cancelled or rescheduled based on discussions after his surgery. The surgery was successful, with his surgical wound expected to take six weeks to heal, and for him to make a 90% recovery in six months. However, the recovery period for the pain in his hand is unknown.

In July 2017, Yoshiki performed six concerts with X Japan. He also performed a series of seven Evening with Yoshiki dinner shows in Osaka, Nagoya, and Tokyo. In October 2017, Yoshiki completed a 10-country tour of Europe promoting the X Japan documentary We Are X.

In 2018, Yoshiki released the song "Red Swan" featuring Hyde, as the opening theme of the third season of the Attack on Titan anime, reaching #1 on the iTunes rock charts in 10 countries. In September, it was announced that Yoshiki would feature on Sarah Brightman's album Hymn, with a newly recorded version of his composition "Miracle". The digital single version of "Miracle" hit the top 10 on classical charts in 15 countries, and Yoshiki was announced as a guest performer on Sarah Brightman's Hymn World Tour in 2019 in selected cities in the US and Japan. On New Year's Eve in 2018, he performed in the traditional TV show, Kouhaku Uta Gassen, where, for the first time in the show's history, he was a member of both the Red and the White teams, teaming up with Hyde for a performance of Red Swan and then joining Brightman for Miracle.

In January 2019, it was announced that Yoshiki will partner with The H Collective to compose the score and theme song for the fourth installment of Vin Diesel's xXx film series and create the theme for the animated feature film Spycies. In February 2019, Yoshiki appeared as the featured pianist on Hyde's single "Zipang", and in March 2019, New York-area PBS station WNET Thirteen premiered a one-hour version of his 2017 Carnegie Hall concert. The Yoshiki: Live at Carnegie Hall special began airing on PBS stations nationwide in November.

In November 2019, YouTube Originals announced the documentary series Yoshiki - Life Of A Japanese Rock Star would premiere on the streaming platform in March 2020. In December 2019, Yoshiki appeared on stage with Kiss during their End of the Road World Tour, playing piano for "Beth" and drums for "Rock and Roll All Nite" at Tokyo Dome and Kyocera Dome Osaka. They later collaborated for a televised New Year's Eve performance of "Rock and Roll All Nite" under the name "YoshiKiss" on NHK's 70th Kouhaku Uta Gassen.

In January 2020, Yoshiki wrote and produced the debut song "Imitation Rain" for male vocal group SixTones, which launched at number one on the Oricon chart and the Billboard Japan Hot 100 chart, and sold 1.3 million physical copies in its first week.

In March 2020, Yoshiki collaborated with Bono, Will.i.am, and Jennifer Hudson to create "#SING4LIFE", a song written and compiled remotely by the four musicians to lift spirits during the COVID-19 pandemic. In August 2020, St. Vincent and Yoshiki teamed to create a classical arrangement of her song "New York". In September 2020, "Disney - My Music Story: Yoshiki" premiered on the Disney+ service, featuring Yoshiki's new arrangements of themes from Disney films The Lion King and Frozen. In November 2020, Yoshiki's photobook XY with images by American photographer Melanie Pullen, placed number one in the Oricon weekly book chart.

Yoshiki's online concert presented by YouTube Originals titled Under the Sky, with Marilyn Manson, The Chainsmokers, Nicole Scherzinger, Lindsey Stirling, the Scorpions, Hyde, Sugizo, Sarah Brightman, SixTones, and St. Vincent was postponed from its December 2020 premiere due to post-production delays caused by COVID-19. On December 31, 2020, Yoshiki performed a virtual collaboration of X Japan's song "Endless Rain" on Kouhaku Uta Gassen with Roger Taylor and Brian May of Queen, Sarah Brightman, Babymetal, SixTones, Lisa, and Milet. In October 2021, Yoshiki gave a virtual piano performance of "Miracle" for BMW Japan's 40th anniversary event.

In October 2022, Yoshiki and NTV premiered the talent competition show "Yoshiki Superstar Project X", which ranked number 1 in Hulu Japan's domestic variety show category. On November 11, a new supergroup project called The Last Rockstars was announced, featuring Yoshiki, Hyde, Miyavi, and Sugizo. The group released their first single, "The Last Rockstars (Paris Mix)", in December of the same year. In January 2023, the group launched their first international tour with sold-out shows in Tokyo, New York, and Los Angeles.

On February 23, 2023, Yoshiki gave the keynote address at Stanford University's conference on "The Future of Social Tech".

 Influences 
When asked what the albums were the most influential for him, Yoshiki named Led Zeppelin IV by Led Zeppelin, Alive! by Kiss and Killers by Iron Maiden. Yoshiki stated he loved "the punkish elements" of the albums by Iron Maiden and that their work got him into punk rock. He was into punk rock bands from the United Kingdom and Japan such as The Exploited, Chaos UK, Discharge, GISM, and Gauze around 1984. He also cited the Sex Pistols, The Clash, and G.B.H. as his favorite bands.

Yoshiki has also named Schubert's "Unfinished" Symphony and Beethoven's 5th Symphony as influences. His favorite classical composers also include J. S. Bach, Schoenberg, Berg, Tchaikovsky, Mozart, Rachmaninoff, and Chopin.

He named John Bonham as his biggest drumming inspiration and cited Cozy Powell as the reason he started to play double bass drums. He also likes Peter Criss, Shuichi Murakami, Jun Aoyama from T-Square, and Minato Masafumi from Dead End. He picked George Winston, Keith Jarrett, Vladimir Horowitz, and Mishiba Satoshi from Kinniku Shōjo Tai as his favorite pianists.『ロッキンf』（1989年11月号）立東社 The Köln Concert by Keith Jarrett inspired him to learn jazz theory and improvisation. He also studied jazz piano under Dick Marx and Shelly Berg.

 Philanthropy 

Yoshiki started his charitable work as a result of losing his father to suicide at a young age, saying he wanted to support children who have had traumatic experiences like he did.

In 1995, in response to the Kobe earthquake, Yoshiki held an X Japan's Christmas Eve charity concert in Osaka, and presented the certifications of new pianos to students whose schools were damaged during the earthquake.

In 2009, he invited 200 young orphans to attend two X Japan's concerts in January in Hong Kong, and donated money to a charity organization for orphans. On March 29 and 31, he visited a town in the province of Sichuan, China, which was devastated by the earthquake in 2008, and donated musical instruments to the schools in the area. He again invited children from the local orphanages in Taipei, Taiwan, to be the special guests in the X Japans's concert on May 30. In 2010, he founded Yoshiki Foundation America, a California non-profit, public benefit corporation with tax-exempt status as a section 501(c)3. On July 1, the foundation hosted a free benefit fan event for charity at Club Nokia, Los Angeles. Beneficiaries included the Grammy Foundation, Make-A-Wish Foundation, and St. Vincent Meals on Wheels. In 2011, to provide aid to the victims of March 11's Tōhoku earthquake and tsunami, the Foundation in association with Yahoo! Japan organized the Japan Relief Fundraising Auction, and all the benefits were sent to the Japanese Red Cross. Yoshiki auctioned one of his Kawai Crystal Grand CR-40 pianos, and with restructuring verification system by Yahoo! Auctions, because offers reached high as $20 million, it got sold for $134,931.

In 2014, Yoshiki Foundation America partnered with the MusiCares Foundation in an auction for a private dinner with Yoshiki. The auction awarded the two highest bidders each with a dinner and raised $62,000 for the Grammy Foundation and MusiCares. In 2017, Yoshiki Foundation America donated $100,000 to Hurricane Harvey relief efforts through the MusiCares Foundation. In 2018, the YFA organization donated 10 million yen to assist victims of flooding in Japan, and an additional 10 million yen to assist recovery from the 2018 Hokkaido Eastern Iburi earthquake.

In April 2019, Yoshiki donated $87,900 to Korea for a forest fire accident in Gangwon-do, Korea. In June 2019, Yoshiki visited the Frost School of Music at the University of Miami where he made a $150,000 donation and held a masterclass for students, where he advised the future musicians to "play every concert as if it is your last." Yoshiki's efforts were recognized by the renaming of the Frost School of Music Dean's office as "Yoshiki Dean's Suite". In August 2019, Yoshiki donated 10 million yen to support victims of the Kyoto Animation arson attack, and $100,000 to the Earth Alliance Amazon Forest Fund to prevent destruction of the Amazon Rainforest. In September 2019, Yoshiki donated 10 million yen to support disaster relief in his hometown of Chiba after it was struck by Typhoon Faxai, and later volunteered for manual labor at the recovery site when he returned to Japan. In October 2019, Yoshiki donated an additional 10 million yen to assist recovery in Japan from Typhoon Hagibis. In December 2019, Yoshiki was named as one of Forbes Asia's 30 Heroes of Philanthropy for his contributions to "disaster relief, orphanages and treatment for children with bone-marrow disease."

In January 2020, Yoshiki donated $50,000 to the Australian Red Cross to aid bushfire victims and $50,000 to the Rainforest Trust's Conservation Action Fund. In March 2020, in response to the COVID-19 outbreak, he donated $100,000 to the Recording Academy's MusiCares Foundation COVID-19 relief fund, and $24,000 to several Meals on Wheels locations in Southern California. That same month, the musician also donated 10 million yen to the Japan Red Cross in commemoration of the ninth anniversary of the Great East Japan Earthquake. In April 2020, Yoshiki donated 10 million yen to Japan's National Center for Global Health and Medicine. In May 2020, Yoshiki explained his charitable activities to The Japan Times: "If you have a certain influence with people, I think it’s better for you to announce it. By doing so, you can provide awareness of the situation, as well as inform people about charitable organizations supporting the cause, and people may get inspired by your actions as well," said Yoshiki. "The goal is to do as much good as we can for others."

In March 2021, the Japanese government awarded Yoshiki the Medal with Dark Blue Ribbon for his charity work through Yoshiki Foundation America. That same month, Yoshiki and MusiCares announced the formation of a $100,000 annual grant to help music creators and industry professionals with programs for depression, anxiety, suicide prevention and awareness, and other mental health concerns. In March 2022, Yoshiki helped raise over $9 million USD for humanitarian relief efforts in Ukraine after announcing his own donation to the fundraiser initiated by Hiroshi Mikitani, CEO of Rakuten. The same year, Yoshiki continued his support for the people of Ukraine with two donations totaling 20 million yen in November and December to the United Nations agency International Organization for Migration (IOM) for its emergency relief operations in Ukraine and neighboring countries.

 Fashion 
In 2011, Yoshiki debuted Yoshikimono, a line of rock-inspired kimono, at the Asia Girls Explosion fashion event in collaboration with Tokyo Girls Collection. Yoshiki created the fashion brand to pay tribute to his parents who ran a kimono shop when he was growing up. The collection debuted its first fashion show during the finale of the 2015 Mercedes-Benz Fashion Week in Tokyo,  and was invited to open Amazon Fashion Week Tokyo 2017. Yoshikimono opened Tokyo Fashion Week 2020 S/S with the brand's third collection, which featured kimono designed around characters from the anime series Attack on Titan and the comic book series Blood Red Dragon, co-created by Stan Lee.In August 2017, Yoshiki was chosen for the cover of Vogue Japan, as the first Japanese male to do so.

In October 2018, Yoshiki was the featured model for the Yves Saint Laurent YSL Beauty Hotel opening event in Tokyo, participating in a female makeup demonstration applied by Yves Saint Laurent's beauty director Tom Pecheux.

In September 2020, Yoshiki was featured on the cover of fashion magazine Numero Tokyo, and in October 2020, Kodansha announced Yoshiki's fashion photo book XY, shot at the Paramour Estate in Los Angeles.

In October 2021, French fine crystal manufacturer Baccarat debuted a 180th anniversary version of its Harcourt glass at Paris Fashion Week 2022 designed by Yoshiki.

 Business ventures 
Yoshiki has launched several business ventures, including music recording, entertainment, wine, energy drinks, fashion, finance, and lifestyle products.

In 1986 Yoshiki founded Extasy Records in Japan with money he received from his mother when she sold her business, later established Extasy Japan and Extasy Records International, around 2000. He also founded Japanese record label Platinum Records in April 1992 as an affiliate of PolyGram.

In 1992, Yoshiki purchased One On One Recording, a recording studio complex in North Hollywood from Jim David, renaming it Extasy Recording Studios after his own record label in 1999. He sold the studio in 2012, and it later became 17 Hertz Studio. In April 1998, he bought Brooklyn Recording Studios, which housed the Los Angeles offices of Maverick Records, from owners Madonna and Freddy DeMann. He renamed it One On One South before using it as the headquarters of Extasy Records International. In 2013, Yoshiki bought The Pass, a Los Angeles recording studio previously known as Larrabee East.

On May 15, 2000, Yoshiki invented a method for reproducing mp3 music and holds a patent for compressed music data playback technology.

In 2009, with California winemaker Michael Mondavi, Yoshiki launched a wine brand titled "Y by Yoshiki", which consists of a Chardonnay and a Cabernet Sauvignon from a 2008 vintage.

In 2015, the Yoshiki Channel was launched on Niconico Video, a Japanese video platform. The channel streams exclusive live shows and distributes links for movies and magazines.

Yoshiki also has his own Hello Kitty product line, named Yoshikitty.

Yoshiki has partnered with researchers to investigate music as therapy. Yoshiki also has branded MasterCard and Visa credit cards, and is an investor in Green Lord Motors.

In May 2022, Yoshiki formed a business partnership with Coca-Cola Japan to create the energy drinks "Real Gold X" and "Real Gold Y", themed after Yoshiki's connection to rock music and classical music, respectively.

In August 2022, French Champagne house Pommery announced a collaboration with Yoshiki as the brand's first co-release with a celebrity artist.

 Equipment 

Yoshiki said he considers himself a groove drummer. He normally wears a neck brace when playing the drums; as a result of his years of "headbanging" while drumming, he injured his neck and had to undergo surgery. In 2015, Yoshiki stated he is more of a songwriter than a drummer.

Tama Drums created a custom-made acrylic drum set for Yoshiki to use on stage, the ArtStar series. Yoshiki admitted that the clear acrylic shells are great for appearances, allowing the stage lights to color his drums with varying hues, but are not ideal sound-wise. He explained that the clear drums are difficult to play because they do not have the usual responsiveness of wooden shells and are not very durable; as they require much more physical pounding to deliver a good sound and that causes the heads to be essentially ruined after only a single concert. Yoshiki's live kit uses two  kick drums, and centers the 14" snare drum directly in front of him. He usually works with five tom drums: three rack toms with diameters of 12", 13", and 14", and two floor toms with diameters of 16" and 18". However, in the studio he uses a limited made titanium kit from Kitano drum called Tama Artstar II "Titan Body" with Evans coated heads.

Yoshiki usually performs on a Kawai Crystal II Grand Piano CR-40A. Kawai also makes a Yoshiki-model grand piano of traditional wooden design.

He has a constant numbness of two fingers on his left hand that he says makes it difficult to play piano. He also suffers from chronic tendonitis on his right hand, which may cause him to be unable to play musical instruments in the future.

 Discography 

Solo studio albumsEternal Melody (April 21, 1993) Eternal Melody II (March 23, 2005)Yoshiki Classical'' (August 27, 2013)

Tours and concerts
Solo

December 3–4, 2002: Symphonic Concert, Tokyo International Forum, Tokyo
2014: Yoshiki Classical World Tour Part 1
 2016: Yoshiki Classical World Tour Part 2
January 12–13, 2017: Yoshiki Classical Special with Tokyo Philharmonic Orchestra, Carnegie Hall, New York
August 26 and 29, 2017: Evening With Yoshiki, Nagoya, Osaka
June 24, 2018: Lunatic Fest
July 13–16, August 31, September 1, 2018: Breakfast with Yoshiki, Evening with Yoshiki, Tokyo
August 9–12, 23–25, 2019: Evening/Breakfast with Yoshiki 2019 in Tokyo
August 11–15, 19–21, 26–28, 2022: Evening/Breakfast With Yoshiki 2022 In Tokyo
With X Japan

With Sarah Brightman
"Hymn: Sarah Brightman In Concert" - 2019 (New York, Los Angeles, San Francisco, and London)
"A Starlight Symphony: An Evening with Sarah Brightman" - 2022 (Las Vegas and Mexico)

Awards

References

External links 

 

Yoshiki Foundation America website

1965 births
20th-century classical composers
20th-century male pianists
20th-century classical pianists
20th-century drummers
20th-century Japanese composers
20th-century Japanese male musicians
21st-century classical composers
21st-century male pianists
21st-century classical pianists
21st-century drummers
21st-century Japanese composers
21st-century Japanese male musicians
Globe (band) members
Japanese businesspeople
Japanese classical composers
Japanese classical pianists
Japanese male classical composers
Japanese male classical pianists
Japanese expatriates in the United States
Japanese fashion designers
Japanese heavy metal drummers
Japanese multi-instrumentalists
Japanese philanthropists
Japanese record producers
Japanese rock drummers
Japanese rock pianists
Japanese rock keyboardists
Japanese songwriters
Living people
Musicians from Chiba Prefecture
People from Tateyama, Chiba
Recipients of the Medal of Honor (Japan)
Sirius Satellite Radio
Visual kei musicians
X Japan members